The Transports publics Vevey-Montreux-Chillon-Villeneuve (VMCV) is a public transport operator in and around the Swiss towns of Montreux and Vevey. It operates the region's network of trolleybuses and motor buses.

See also 
 Trolleybuses in Montreux/Vevey
 Vevey–Montreux–Chillon–Villeneuve tramway

External links 
 

Bus companies of Switzerland
Transport in the canton of Vaud